The list of decommissioned ships of the Chilean Navy is mostly compiled from information given in the website of the Chilean Navy. It consists of over 500 historical units including ships of the Patria Vieja, prizes, fireships, armed merchant ships, auxiliary ships, capital ships and, of course, regular warships of the navy ranging from the  capital ship  to small torpedo boats and early wooden vessels.

At the beginning, the Chilean Navy was almost entirely composed of merchant ships enlisted into naval service in time of war, hence the distinction between warships and merchant ships is often blurred and ships changed their status quickly and subtly.

See also:

 Ships under Chilean Letter of marque (in this article)
 List of undelivered ships (in this article)
 List of active ships of the Chilean Navy

Key
Shipname - is a shortened form of the official name but includes the launch year (or commissioning year). Rank and titles of persons are not shown.
HCS - Hull classification symbol
type - is an English translation of the type given in Navy website
t - includes different measures for the size of the ships: Displacement, BRT, BM, Long ton, etc.
Unit - Unit of the previous number
other names - outside the service time in the navy. If the ship was renamed during her service in the navy, then Ren. is set and respectively an Ex- prefix is given in the grey row with the new name.
Init -  the year of the first service for the navy
Builder - shipyard for new ships, the name of the navy that sold the (old) ship or "prize" if the ship was captured
End - last year of service in the navy
Fate- the last information about the ship.
Reference

List of ships operated by the Chilean Navy

List of ships ordered or bought by the Chilean Navy, but never commissioned

List of ships under Chilean Letter of marque
On 20 November 1817 the Chilean government, under Bernardo O'Higgins issued a Letter of marque, a decree authorizing private persons to attack and capture enemy vessels and bring them before courts for condemnation and sale.

Notes

References

Bibliography

External links
 
 
 
 

Chilean Navy
Tall ships of Chile
List
List
Decommissioned